Persicula shepstonensis is a species of sea snail, a marine gastropod mollusk, in the family Cystiscidae.

References

shepstonensis
Gastropods described in 1906
Cystiscidae